Ravenswood  is located north of Broad Ripple  Indianapolis, Indiana, United States, between 71st and 75th Street, and between Keystone Avenue and White River. In 1913, a flood caused the river channel to change its course slightly affecting the Beach near the Yacht Club.

In the early 20th century, Ravenswood was a lively resort area with few permanent residents. In the mid-1940s, the local Volunteer Fire Department had an annual fish fry and weekly movies on the beach. Flooding was a problem but locals coped with it until the late 1960s when development north of the town dredged holding ponds and opened up the channel near the Yacht Club to Williams Creek.

Neighborhoods in Indianapolis
Former municipalities in Indiana